Bettis is an English surname. Notable people with the surname include: 

Angela Bettis (born 1973), American actress, director and producer
Chad Bettis (born 1989), American baseball player
Hilary Bettis, American playwright, actress, producer and writer
J. Warren Bettis (1924–2011), American jurist 
Jerome Bettis (born 1972), American football player
Jerrod Bettis, American music producer, composer and musician
John Bettis (born 1946), American lyricist
Randy Bettis (born 1959), American DJ and music producer
Richard A. Bettis (born 1947), American business theorist
Tom Bettis (1933–2015), American football player
Valerie Bettis (1919–1982), American modern dancer and choreographer
Zachariah Bettis (1816–1879), American politician